= Swamy Jewellery =

Swamy Jewellery is a type of gold and silver jewellery manufactured in the city of Tiruchirappalli in Tamil Nadu, India. Tamil Nadu has a 5000-year-old history of jewellery-making, using materials ranging from fine silver and gold to modern eco-friendly materials such as terra-cotta and jute.
